General elections were held in Ecuador on 17 May 1992, with a second round of the presidential elections on 5 July. The presidential elections resulted in a victory for Sixto Durán Ballén of the Republican Union Party–Conservative Party alliance, who received 57.3% of the vote in the run-off. The Social Christian Party emerged as the largest party in the House of Representatives, winning 21 of the 77 seats.

Results

President

National Congress

References

1992 in Ecuador
Elections in Ecuador
Ecuador
Election and referendum articles with incomplete results